Adalberto Nunes da Silva (born 2 September 1978), commonly known as Betão, is a Brazilian futsal player.

Honours
1 FIFA Futsal World Championship (2008)
2 Copas de España (2006, 2009)
1 Supercopa de España (2009)
1 Intercontinental (2004)
1 Recopa de Europa (06/07)
2 Campeonato Estatal (1999, 2001)
1 Liga Futsal Brasil (2004)
1 Copa Brasil (1998)
1 Campeonato Sudamericano (2006)
1 Pan American Games Champion (2007)
1 Copa América (2007)
2 Grand Prix (2005, 2008)
1 Copa Xunta de Galicia (2005)
1 Top scorer División de Honor (07/08)
1 Copa Libertadores de Ámerica de futsal (2015)

References

External links
lnfs.es

1978 births
Living people
Brazilian men's futsal players
Futsal players at the 2007 Pan American Games
Inter FS players
Santiago Futsal players
Pan American Games gold medalists for Brazil
Pan American Games medalists in futsal
Medalists at the 2007 Pan American Games